Tomi Koivusaari (born 11 April 1973) is the current rhythm guitarist and former vocalist of the Finnish metal band Amorphis.
He started playing at the age of 12, his first band was Violent Solution formed in 1987, with him on guitars and vocals, Esa Holopainen on guitars and Jan Rechberger on drums. The band played thrash metal, recorded a demo and an EP. He also formed a death/doom band called Abhorrence in 1989, and recorded a demo and an EP. Both bands broke up in 1990, but Tomi was not a member of Violent Solution since he formed Abhorrence.

In 1990, Tomi was hired to be in Amorphis.

In 2006, Tomi was briefly in the band Ajattara, under the name "Samuel Lempo".

Discography

With Violent Solution
 Paralysis / Individual Nightmare (1990)
 Period of Depression (1990)

With Abhorrence
 Vulgar Necrolatry (1990)
 Abhorrence (1990)

With Amorphis
 Disment of Soul (demo, 1991)
 Amorphis (single, 1991)
 The Karelian Isthmus (album, 1992)
 Privilege of Evil (EP, 1993)
 Tales from the Thousand Lakes (album, 1994)
 Black Winter Day (EP, 1995)
 Elegy (album, 1996)
 My Kantele (EP, 1997)
 Isle of Joy (bootleg, 1997)
 "Divinity / Northern Lights" (single, 1999)
 Tuonela (album, 1999)
 Story - 10th Anniversary (compilation, 2000)
 Alone (single, 2001)
 Am Universum (album, 2001)
 Far from the Sun (album, 2003)
 Day of Your Beliefs (single, 2003)
 Evil Inside (single, 2003)
 Chapters (best-of compilation, 2003)
 Relapse Singles Series Vol. 4. (split (where Amorphis appears with the self-titled single), 2004)
 "House of Sleep" (single, 2006)
 Eclipse (album, 2006)
 "The Smoke" (single, 2006)
 Silent Waters (album, 2007)
 "Silver Bride" (single, 2009)
 Skyforger (album, 2009)
 Magic & Mayhem - Tales from the Early Years (compilation, 2010)
 "You I Need" (single, 2011)
 The Beginning of Times (2011)
 Circle (2013)
 Under the Red Cloud (2015)
 Queen of Time (2018)
 Halo (2022)

With Ajattara
 Äpäre'' (album, 2006)

References 

1973 births
Living people
Amorphis members
Black metal musicians
Death metal musicians
Finnish heavy metal guitarists
Finnish heavy metal singers
21st-century Finnish male singers
Rhythm guitarists
Sitar players
20th-century Finnish male singers
21st-century guitarists